Karachun is a rural locality (a selo) and the administrative center of Karachunskoye Rural Settlement, Ramonsky District, Voronezh Oblast, Russia. The population was 708 as of 2010. There are 14 streets.

Geography 
Karachun is located 18 km north of Ramon (the district's administrative centre) by road. Pekshevo is the nearest rural locality.

References 

Rural localities in Ramonsky District